Saint Gabriel International School, or  or SGIS, is recognized by the Department of Education in Pasig City, Philippines, owned by Dr. Mildred A. Go, Ed. D.. It started operations in 2000.  It adheres to a global philosophy of education; thus, there is a continuous upgrading of its audio-visual materials to promote a deeper appreciation of countries, history and people, and whenever conditions allow, students are encouraged to go to Xiamen, China for at least two weeks to join the international group of students.  The administration maintains an open communication among teachers, students, parents and even the outside community.  Based on the results of the government exams given to the Seniors every year, the school falls within the upper 15% compared to all other schools in the Division of Pasig City.

Saint Gabriel International School provides ESL classes for students outside the Philippines including South Korean students. Saint Gabriel International School also provides students with Mandarin Chinese classes. The school has an average of 25 students per class.

Facilities
The entire school resides in an area which is approximately 2,50 sq. meters in total, which has options to expand upon acquisition of land areas connected to the school.

Curriculum
A day's schedule is from 8:00 AM to 3:40 PM and a shorter time for the preschool. It uses English as the medium of instruction and offers standard Mandarin handled by native speakers from China. It has a flexible delivery system to maximize the teaching and learning process.  Students are accepted anytime during the school year. From Monday to Thursday, students are required to wear the complete school uniform. And on Fridays, students can wear civilian clothes.

Relations
Saint Gabriel International School is the sister school of the Manila Xiamen International School, a school also owned by Dr. Mildred A. Go, Ed. D. located in Xiamen, Fujian Province, People's Republic of China. SGIS is also called the Philippine Branch or Philippine Address in Manila Xiamen International School's website.

References

External links
Saint Gabriel International School official website
Saint Gabriel International School - Philippine Department of Education

2000 establishments in the Philippines
International schools in Metro Manila
Chinese-language schools in Metro Manila
Educational institutions established in 2000
Schools in Pasig